G. W. Peck is a fictional mathematician.

G. W. Peck may also refer to:

George Washington Peck, U.S. Representative from Michigan
George Wilbur Peck, governor of the U.S. state of Wisconsin